Saphenista pascana is a species of moth of the family Tortricidae. It is found in Peru.

The wingspan is about 19.5 mm. The ground colour of the forewings is cream, at the dorsum and base slightly tinged with brownish. There are some brownish dots, mainly from the middle of the wing to the termen. The hindwings are cream, but paler basally.

Etymology
The species name refers to the department of Pasco, where the type locality is located.

References

Moths described in 2010
Saphenista